The Kapitza Club was a group of physicists who met informally in the 1920s and 1930s in Cambridge, England. The group was founded by Russian physicist Peter Kapitza.

In The Making of the Atomic Bomb, author Richard Rhodes describes the Kaptiza Club:

Graham Farmelo describes the founding of the Kapitza Club in The Strangest Man: The Hidden Life of Paul Dirac, Mystic of the Atom:

Notable members and attendees
Harold D. Babcock (1925)
P. M. S. Blackett (1924)
Paul Dirac (1925)
Douglas Hartree (1924)
Werner Heisenberg (1925)
Herbert Wakefield Banks Skinner (1924)
Llewellyn Thomas (1925)

References

1920s establishments in England
Clubs and societies of the University of Cambridge
History of science and technology in England
History of the University of Cambridge